Calcutta 71 is a 1972 Bengali film directed by noted Indian art film director Mrinal Sen. This film is considered to be the second film of Mrinal Sen's Calcutta trilogy, the others being Interview, and Padatik. The film is a collection of stories depicting the seventies. The Naxalite activity, starvation of common people, social and political corruption are shown. There are four stories shown in the film.

Plot
The first story is about a lower-middle-class family staying in a cottage in a slum area. On a rainy night they are forced to leave the cottage & move to another safe shelter. They find many others had already taken shelter before them.

The second story is about another middle-class family of mother & two mature daughters who were unable to cope with the starvation & poverty and succumbed to prostitution. It was based on the timeline of the Famine that engulfed Bengal in 1942 due to the World War II. Their cousin brother Nalinakhya, who lives in Delhi, comes to visit them & meets the hard reality. After seeing all these he leaves to Delhi. This story is an actual short-story by Probodh Kumar Sanyal which is named 'Angar'.

The third story is of a rural middle-class family where the elder son of a family is involved in smuggling rice to the city forsaking his school and education. The boys including him in the train insults rich people's way of life and attitude. One man beats one of the boys severely but as a revenge, the boy pushes that man off from the train to the station. 

The fourth story is about the Kolkata's upper class society gossiping and listening to a music concert over drinking cocktails without any exposure to the common people. An upper-class man talks philosophies and says he is very disappointed about the condition of the poor in India. But actually he is a hypocrite, who exploits the poor employees of his factory and makes money by torturing them. This story portrays the elite of the society in a grey manner where they are aware of the misdoing in society while not reacting to rectify the same. 

In the final scene, the death of truth is represented in the death of a youth chased and killed by the police.

There is also an optional story in the prologue which portrays a satirical courtroom drama of a young man vandalizing a statue out of un-employment induced frustration. The court decides the fault to lie within the society itself, but it punishes the man to death.

References

External links
 
 On the Mrinal Sen website
 A review

1972 films
1972 drama films
Bengali-language Indian films
Indian drama films
Films directed by Mrinal Sen
Films set in Kolkata
Second Best Feature Film National Film Award winners
1970s Bengali-language films
Films based on works by Samaresh Basu